Concord High School is a public high school in Concord, New Hampshire, in the United States.

History 
Concord's first public high school was established in 1846. The original building was the building on the corner of State and School streets. A new school house was built in 1862, which stood until April 1888, when it burned down during a fire started by a chemistry experiment. For the next two years, students took their classes in City Hall. A new high school was built on the same lot, completed and dedicated in September 1890. In 1907, yet another Concord High School, designed to accommodate 500 students, was built on Spring Street in the building which became Kimball School. (The building was demolished in 2012 to make way for the new Christa McAuliffe Elementary School.) The current high school was built in 1927 on Warren Street, with new wings added in 1960 and 1996. 
 
Some of the features that Concord High currently has are a new media center (library), student center (cafeteria), performing arts area, and four commons areas, each with its own administrative and student community where student lockers were located. ConcordTV, the local public, educational, and government access (PEG) cable TV station for Concord, is currently located in Concord High. There is a bridge/connector between two wings, east and west, of the building.

Principals 
Charles C. Cook was Headmaster for thirty years from 1906 to 1936. Cook began the National Honor Society Chapter which still exists at Concord High School. Other long-serving principals include John E. Reed who was principal from 1939 to 1960, J. Preston Barry from 1961 to 1972, Charlie Foley who was principal from 1973 to 1990, Gene Connolly who was principal from 2001 to 2016. Some of the more recent principals of the school include Tom Sica from 2016 to 2020 and Michael Reardon from 2020 to present.

In the recent history of Concord High School, Dr. Christine Rath (principal from 1991 to 1997) oversaw the transformation of the school from a three-year to a four-year school which included ninth-grade students. At the same time Rath assisted in the design of the current high school building which was able to accommodate every high school student in Concord.

Athletics 
The current athletic director is Steve Mello (two time AD of the year).

Some athletic teams that Concord High School has are cross country, football, wrestling, golf and soccer.

Notable events 
On December 3, 1985, a 16 year old dropout named Louis Cartier entered the building with a shotgun, and was promptly killed by Concord police officers. No other fatalities occurred in the shooting, other than Cartier.

At Concord High's first dance of the 2006–2007 school year, the school drew local media attention when administration ejected about a dozen students for grinding, a style of dancing that the administration deemed overly sexual for a school function. In protest of this, about 150 other students walked out of the dance. The administration met with student body leaders to try to reach an agreement. They were not able to, and for the first time in the school's history, the homecoming dance was postponed, and every other dance that year was canceled. An exception was made for the senior prom, however.

Another notable event which occurred at Concord High School was the resignation of Principal Tom Sica. Sica had been the principal of Rundlett Middle school before moving up to Concord High School in 2016. During his time as principal at Rundlett, allegations of sexual assault and misconduct were placed upon a teacher, Howie Leung. The student who brought this to Sica's attention was promptly suspended for three days for "spreading 'malicious and slanderous gossip'". Once he had moved to the high school, news of this suspension, and the circumstances surrounding it, were brought to the public, leading to outrage in the Concord community. Leung was arrested in 2019 for sexual assault charges, and pled "not guilty".

Notable alumni and faculty 
John Adams, composer
Matt Bonner, former basketball player for the San Antonio Spurs
Edward H. Brooks (1893–1978), officer in the United States Army and veteran
Elizabeth Eaton Converse, later known as Connie Converse, singer-songwriter
Deborah Jean Howard, Miss New Hampshire 1991
Sam Knox, American football player
Joe Lefebvre, Major League Baseball outfielder from 1980 to 1986
Guor Marial, South Sudanese marathon runner
Christa McAuliffe, teacher who died on the Space Shuttle Challenger disaster (STS-51-L)
Fanny E. Minot (1847-1919), valedictorian, 1865; national president, Woman's Relief Corps, 1904
Tara Mounsey, Olympic hockey player
Brian Sabean, general manager for the San Francisco Giants
David Souter, Associate Justice of the Supreme Court of the United States

References

External links
Official Web Site
CHS on ClassReport (a class reunion website)

Educational institutions established in 1846
Schools in Concord, New Hampshire
Public high schools in New Hampshire
1846 establishments in New Hampshire